John Vanthof (born ) is a politician in Ontario, Canada. He is a New Democratic member of the Legislative Assembly of Ontario who was elected in 2011. He represents the riding of Timiskaming—Cochrane. On August 23, 2018 he was named one of the party's two Deputy Leaders alongside Sara Singh, and critic for Agriculture and Food, and for Rural Development.

Background
Vanthof was born and raised on a dairy farm near New Liskeard, Ontario. He is the nephew of veteran Progressive Conservative MPP Ernie Hardeman. Prior to entering politics he was president of the Temiskaming Federation of Agriculture, a farmer's lobby group. He was a vocal opponent of the proposal to ship garbage from Toronto and bury it at Adams Mine.

Politics
In the 2007 provincial election, Vanthof ran as the New Democrat candidate in the riding of Timiskaming—Cochrane. He was defeated by incumbent Liberal David Ramsay by 634 votes. He tried again in 2011 this time winning against Liberal candidate Denis Bonin by 6,101 votes. He was re-elected in the 2014 provincial election defeating Liberal candidate Sébastien Goyer by 8,490 votes. In the 2018 provincial election he was re-elected by a margin of 10,646 votes over Progressive Conservative Margaret Williams. Vanthof was re-elected for a third time in the 2022 provincial election, defeating Progressive Conservative candidate Bill Foy.

In opposition, he served as his party's critic for Natural Resources and Agriculture, Food and Rural Affairs.

Electoral record

References

External links

1963 births
Living people
Ontario New Democratic Party MPPs
People from Timiskaming District
21st-century Canadian politicians